Terno may refer to:

 Gerda Maria Terno, a German actress
 Maria Clara terno, a traditional dress in the Philippines
 Terno, a Polish music collective